Barbara Nanning (born January 3, 1957, The Hague, Netherlands) is a Dutch sculptor, ceramicist and glass artist.

Life 
Nanning studied at the Gerrit Rietveld Academy from 1974 to 1979 under Harry op de Laak, Jan van der Vaart, and at the Rijksacademie in Amsterdam in 1978.

In 1978–79 she started her own studio in Amsterdam-West, which she shared with Geert Lap until 1981, and Irene Vonck from 1981 to 1984. She made study trips to Mexico in 1982, to Cappadocië in Turkije in 1988, and to Japan in 1991.

One of her first major solo exhibitions was in the Gallery Aspects in London in 1985; followed by solo-exhibitions in the Stedelijk Museum Amsterdam in 1993 and 1998; at the Clara Scremini Gallery in Paris in 1995, 1996, 2002 and 2008; and at the Galerie Carla Koch in Amsterdam in 2008, 2009 and 2009, among other places.

Work 

Although Nanning was trained as a ceramic designer, since 1995 she also made a lot of works with glass. In addition to her smaller works, she regularly receives commissions for monumental works that were placed in the public space. Flowers thereby form a recurring topic, such as in the 11 ceramic flower shapes she made in 1999 for the National Police. In 2001 Nanning explained about the central theme in her work:
Nature is my source: plants, leaves, roots, water and the wind. Natural phenomena have been an everlasting inspiration for me, be it the Milky Way or the rise and fall of waves in an eternal, natural movement. In clay, my thrown shapes have evolved into concentric spinning objects without a beginning or end. They represent eternal movement, the primeval source of life on earth. In order to make these forms seem even more weightless, intangible and floating, I gave them a rich, velvety surface and a light monochrome colour.

And furthermore 
Since 1990, colour has played an essential role in my work. I do not use traditional glazes, but bright-coloured pigments that belong to the domain of the painter. As a result, I have access to a palette of colours that is not normally a part of my field. Bright red, brilliant yellow, intense blue and deep purple give my work an unexpected dimension... I work in series, making groups of works based on a common theme, including the  Galaxy, Terra, Hydras, Botanica and Coral Reef series. 'Siren' is a red sculpture from the Botanica series. It is formed from different hand thrown segments and hand-built leaves and is inspired by the Greek mythology. The Sirens were beautiful women with irresistible singing voices who lived in a treacherous rock formation in the middle of the sea. They had a fatal attraction on passing sailors. 'Siren' symbolises a freakish forbidden attraction.

Works (selection) 
 1997 Liggende bloem, Aalsmeer
 1999 Bloemknoppen, at the Korps Landelijke Politiediensten (KLPD) in Driebergen
 2007 Petrified Dynamic Flows, Fuji-monument in Gotenba

Further reading 
 L. Crommelin, P. Donker-Duyvis, Barbara Nanning, Galaxy & Terra, Ceramics - Reizen in tijd en ruimte, Amsterdam, 1993.
 T.G. te Duits, Barbara Nanning Evolution, Amsterdam, 1993 .

See also 
 List of Dutch sculptors
 List of Dutch ceramists

References

External links 

 barbarananning.nl website
 Nanning, Barbara at capriolus.nl
 Works of Barbara Nanning at Keramiekmuseum Princessehof.

1957 births
Living people
Dutch ceramists
Dutch sculptors
Dutch women ceramists
Dutch women sculptors
Gerrit Rietveld Academie alumni
Artists from The Hague